Damara is a town located in the Central African Republic prefecture of Ombella-M'Poko. It is located about an hour from the national capital, Bangui.

In March 2013, rebels from the Séléka Coalition ( means "alliance" in the Sango language) overtook a checkpoint in Damara. Part of the 2012-2013 Central African Republic conflict, the rebels claimed that President of the Central African Republic François Bozizé had violated the terms of a January cease-fire agreement. After storming the Damara checkpoint, however, the rebels were prevented from taking Bangui by a helicopter attack. "The helicopter opened fire on the column, forcing it to disperse... The rebels have not reached Bangui," said a senior military analyst quoted by Reuters.

References

Sub-prefectures of the Central African Republic
Populated places in Ombella-M'Poko